Blue Mound Township is located in Macon County, Illinois. As of the 2010 census, its population was 890 and it contained 387 housing units.

Cities and towns 
 Blackland
 Boody

Adjacent townships 
 Harristown Township (north)
 Decatur Township (northeast)
 South Wheatland Township (east)
 South Macon Township (southeast)
 Pleasant View Township (south)
 Mosquito Township, Christian County (southwest and west)
 Niantic Township (northwest)

Geography

Demographics

References

External links
US Census
City-data.com
Illinois State Archives

Townships in Macon County, Illinois
1859 establishments in Illinois
Populated places established in 1859
Townships in Illinois